Pulimamidi is a village in Nawabpet Mandal of Ranga Reddy district in the Indian state of Telangana, about  from Hyderabad.

Religion 
A temple is dedicated to Hanuman. It celebrates the Sri Rama Navami. The festivals of Bonalu and Vinayaka Chaviti are also celebrated in Pulimamidi. One of the temples called Chikati Venkateswara Swamy temple located at Pulimamidi ,this temple having nearly 250 acres of land. This temple is built by Akkanna Madhanna.

References 

Villages in Ranga Reddy district